Our Lady of the Lake Regional Medical Center (OLOLRMC) is a general medical and surgical facility located in Baton Rouge, Louisiana. It is a Catholic hospital member of the Franciscan Missionaries of Our Lady Health System (FMOLHS). The hospital is accredited by the Joint Commission, and it serves as a teaching hospital to Our Lady of the Lake College, Louisiana State University, Tulane University, and Southern University.

OLOLRMC is the dominant institution in healthcare in the Greater Baton Rouge area and the largest private medical center in Louisiana, with over 1,020 beds. In a given year, OLOLRMC treats approximately 25,000 patients in the hospital, and services about 350,000 persons through outpatient locations. It has a complement of almost 900 physicians and 3,000 staff members. The Lake also operates two nursing homes, has an affiliated cancer facility adjacent to the main hospital, and operates a number of outpatient services on its campus as well as in outlying locations.

History
In 1911, Mother de Bethanie Crowley and five Franciscan Missionaries of Our Lady traveled to America, stating their desire to serve the sick and needy. Eight years after establishing a hospital in Monroe, Louisiana, Mother de Bethanie was invited to Baton Rouge by Monsignor Francis Leon Gassler of St. Joseph's Cathedral and a group of leading local physicians, to tour the downtown area in search of a suitable location for a hospital to serve the 22,000 residents of the small river town. Mother de Bethanie insisted on a location across University Lake from the original Louisiana State University campus.

In November 1923, the four-story brick structure of Our Lady of the Lake Sanitarium opened its doors to the city. In April 1978, the original hospital was closed and a 460-bed facility on Essen Lane opened to better serve a population that had grown to the south and east of the original location. Throughout the years, the facilities have undergone expansion. There are current plans to build a free-standing Children's Hospital in a nearby area.

OLOLRMC is the only Catholic-sponsored hospital in Greater Baton Rouge area and the oldest unbroken ownership and affiliation of any area hospital (since 1923). It is aligned with three FMOLHS sister hospitals across Louisiana (Our Lady of Lourdes in Lafayette; St. Francis Medical Center in Monroe; St. Elizabeth Hospital in Gonzales).

Children’s Hospital
OLOL Children's Hospital is a hospital within a hospital that has 90 inpatient pediatric beds, including 60 medical/surgical, 14 level 1 PICU beds and 10 hematology/oncology units. It has over 6,300 discharges annually and is the only 24/7 pediatric emergency department in the Baton Rouge area. OLOLRMC also has the only Certified Child Life Specialists department and Pediatric Sedation Service in the area, and is affiliated with Woman's Hospital for newborn and neonatal care. Pediatric Hematology-Oncology service is a St. Jude Children's Hospital affiliate. Since 2010, OLOLRMC is also home to the only pediatric residency program in the Baton Rouge area.

In late 2019, OLOLRMC opened as the second free-standing children's hospital in Louisiana. The $230 million project began in 2016, with completion expected by late 2018, but due to fundraising delays was pushed back to 2019. The new hospital has six floors and its own emergency room. Every floor is said to have its own playroom. OLOLRMC will continue its partnership with St. Jude Children's Research Hospital, and offer hematology/oncology services and chemotherapy within its hospital for St. Jude patients.

Services
OLOLRMC Cancer Center is Baton Rouge area's only peripheral blood stem cell transplantation program, and only high-dose Interleukin II chemotherapy treatment center in Louisiana. In regards to oncology, OLOLRMC also provides access to clinical trials. Overall, more open-heart procedures than any other hospital in Louisiana are done at OLOLRMC. Likewise, more joint procedures than any other Louisiana hospital. It is the only hospital in Louisiana with a Nuclear Medicine department accredited by ICANL (Intersocietal Commission for the Accreditation of Nuclear Medicine Laboratories). The hospital also manages a blood-doning service. OLOLRMC was the first hospital in the world to use an integrated radiology information system (RIS) and PACS to achieve a completely filmless environment.

LSU Health Baton Rouge 
LSU Health Baton Rouge is a division of Our Lady of the Lake that operates local clinics in Baton Rouge.

References

External links
 Franciscan Missionaries of Our Lady Health System
 Our Lady of the Lake Regional Medical Center
 Our Lady of the Lake Children's Hospital

Hospitals established in 1923
Hospital buildings completed in 1978
Hospitals in Louisiana
Teaching hospitals in Louisiana
Buildings and structures in Baton Rouge, Louisiana
Franciscan hospitals
1923 establishments in Louisiana
Catholic hospitals in North America
Trauma centers
Catholic health care